Prizna  is a port village in Croatia. It is connected by the D406 highway and by ferry.

References

Populated places in Lika-Senj County